Pirri is a surname. Notable people with the name include: 

 Brandon Pirri (born 1991), Canadian ice hockey player
 David Pirri (born 1974), Spanish football player and manager
 Jim Pirri, American actor, voice actor and fight choreographer
 Massimo Pirri (1945–2001), Italian film director and screenwriter